Léon Achard (16 February 1831 – 10 July 1905) was a French tenor.

Biography 
He studied at a major Parisian high school, Louis-le-Grand or Henri IV, and then went on to study law. After completing his law studies, Achard entered a lawyer's office, while taking courses at the Conservatoire de Paris. After one year, he was awarded the First Prizes in singing and opéra comique.

Subsequently, Achard was hired by the Théâtre-Lyrique, then directed by Léon Carvalho. There he interpreted Tobias, alongside Pauline Lauters, in Le Billet de Marguerite by Gevaert, play premiered on 7 October 1854.

References

Bibliography 
 .

1831 births
Musicians from Lyon
1905 deaths
Conservatoire de Paris alumni
French operatic tenors
19th-century French male opera singers
Burials at Montmartre Cemetery